Defending champion Novak Djokovic defeated Andy Murray in the final, 6–1, 7–6(7–4) to win the men's singles tennis title at the 2012 Miami Open. It was his third Miami Open title. He did not lose a single set in the entire tournament.

Seeds
All seeds received a bye into the second round.

  Novak Djokovic (champion)
  Rafael Nadal (semifinals, withdrew because of a left knee injury)
  Roger Federer (third round)
  Andy Murray (final)
  David Ferrer (quarterfinals)
  Jo-Wilfried Tsonga (quarterfinals)
  Tomáš Berdych (third round)
  Mardy Fish (quarterfinals)
  Janko Tipsarević (quarterfinals)
  John Isner (third round)
  Juan Martín del Potro (fourth round)
  Nicolás Almagro (fourth round)
  Gilles Simon (fourth round)
  Gaël Monfils (third round)
  Feliciano López (second round)
  Kei Nishikori (fourth round)
  Richard Gasquet (fourth round)
  Alexandr Dolgopolov (third round)
  Florian Mayer (fourth round)
  Fernando Verdasco (third round)
  Juan Mónaco (semifinals)
  Jürgen Melzer (third round)
  Marin Čilić (third round)
  Marcel Granollers (second round)
  Radek Štěpánek (third round)
  Milos Raonic (third round, withdrew because of a sprained right ankle)
  Viktor Troicki (third round)
  Kevin Anderson (third round)
  Juan Ignacio Chela (second round)
  Julien Benneteau (third round)
  Andy Roddick (fourth round)
  Philipp Kohlschreiber (third round)

Draw

Finals

Top half

Section 1

Section 2

Section 3

Section 4

Bottom half

Section 5

Section 6

Section 7

Section 8

Qualifying

Seeds

Qualifiers

Lucky losers
  Tobias Kamke

Draw

First qualifier

Second qualifier

Third qualifier

Fourth qualifier

Fifth qualifier

Sixth qualifier

Seventh qualifier

Eighth qualifier

Ninth qualifier

Tenth qualifier

Eleventh qualifier

Twelfth qualifier

References
 Main Draw
 Qualifying Draw

Sony Ericsson Open - Men's Singles
2012 Sony Ericsson Open
Men in Florida